Iris Adriana Mora Vallejo (born 22 September 1981) is a Mexican former footballer who played as a forward. She has been a member of the Mexico women's national team.

College career
Mora attended the University of California, Los Angeles in the United States.

International career
Mora played for Mexico at senior level in the 1999 FIFA Women's World Cup, two CONCACAF Women's Championship editions (2002 and 2006) and the 2004 Summer Olympics.

See also
 Mexico at the 2004 Summer Olympics

References

External links
 
http://www.espn.com/espnw/sports/article/15204801/monica-gonzalez-urges-mexican-federation-seize-opportunity-promote-women-game
http://magazine.ucla.edu/features/womens-soccer-newest-bruin-champs/
http://dailybruin.com/2003/07/13/soccer-player-mora-to-return-t/

1981 births
Living people
Women's association football forwards
Mexican women's footballers
Footballers from Quintana Roo
People from Cancún
Mexico women's international footballers
1999 FIFA Women's World Cup players
Olympic footballers of Mexico
Footballers at the 2004 Summer Olympics
UCLA Bruins women's soccer players
Mexican expatriate women's footballers
Mexican expatriate sportspeople in the United States
Expatriate women's soccer players in the United States
Pan American Games silver medalists for Mexico
Pan American Games bronze medalists for Mexico
Footballers at the 1999 Pan American Games
Footballers at the 2003 Pan American Games
Pan American Games medalists in football
Medalists at the 1999 Pan American Games
Medalists at the 2003 Pan American Games
Mexican footballers